The regional news agency DNIESTER was a privately held independent news agency that covered political processes and trends in the southwest region of former USSR.

History 
The news and analytical Internet portal was formed in Tiraspol on 13 July 2009 by Roman Konoplev. The main purpose of the project was to analyse the sociopolitical situation in Moldova, Transnistria (also known as Pridnestrovie), and Ukraine.

The agency was also involved in monitoring the media of Romania and other European Union  countries that publish materials about the region.

After the presidential elections of 2011 in Transnistria the agency DNIESTER became known as an opposition-leaning. The website of the agency was under constant DDOS attack in the period of summer-authumn 2012.

On 8 November 2012 the website of the agency DNIESTER was blocked by the local Internet providers at the territory of Transnistria. Experts of The Independent Journalism Center (IJC) of Moldova monitored the situation.

Both the IJC "Press Freedom Report Republic of Moldova 2013" and "The Report on press freedom and media in Moldova", published in 2015 by the NGO Freedom House, covered the situation with the news agency DNIESTER.

On 8 September 2017 it was announced that the activity of the agency has been suspended.

References

External links 

  ; English
 Archive of website dniester.ru (Bavarian State Library)
 Press Freedom Report Republic of Moldova 2013

Moldovan news websites
News agencies based in Moldova
Mass media in Transnistria
Mass media companies established in 2009
Mass media companies disestablished in 2017
2009 establishments in Moldova
2017 disestablishments in Moldova